Yang Yun, born October 6, 1988), is a Chinese professional footballer who currently plays as a defender for Shijiazhuang Ever Bright.

Club career
Born in Shanghai, Yang Yun originally began his football career playing for the Shanghai Shenhua youth team, however he was unable to break into their senior team due to the merger with Shanghai United F.C. and the significant increase in the squad size. Almost leaving the club he would instead be loaned out to Singapore side Liaoning Guangyuan FC to gain more playing opportunities. When he returned he would finally be promoted to the senior side and would go on to be scouted by Juventus F.C. before agreeing a loan move to second tier club Nanchang Bayi halfway through the 2009 league season. Yang's move turned out to be a huge success and he helped guide the team to a runners-up position and promotion to the top tier.

Yang Yun transferred to China League One club Chongqing Lifan in February 2011. On 5 January 2017, Yang moved to League One side Qingdao Huanghai. He joined fellow China League One side Shijiazhuang Ever Bright on 22 February 2019. In his first season with the club he would help the team to a runners-up position and promotion into the top tier.

Career statistics
Statistics accurate as of match played 31 December 2020.

Honours

Club
Chongqing Lifan
China League One: 2014

References

External links
Player stats at sohu.com
 

1988 births
Living people
Chinese footballers
Footballers from Shanghai
Shanghai Shenhua F.C. players
Shanghai Shenxin F.C. players
Chongqing Liangjiang Athletic F.C. players
Qingdao F.C. players
Cangzhou Mighty Lions F.C. players
Chinese Super League players
China League One players
Association football defenders